Mochlus striatus is a species of skink. It is endemic to Central Africa and found in Gabon, Cameroon, the Republic of Congo, and the Central African Republic. It inhabits rainforest areas, swamps, and coastal forests.

Mochlus striatus measure  in snout–vent length.

References

Mochlus
Skinks of Africa
Reptiles of Cameroon
Reptiles of the Central African Republic
Reptiles of Gabon
Reptiles of the Republic of the Congo
Reptiles described in 1854
Taxa named by Edward Hallowell (herpetologist)